The Dr. William W. Mayo House, located at 118 North Main Street in Le Sueur, Minnesota, United States, is listed on the National Register of Historic Places (NRHP). It was built in 1859 by James Mayo and his brother, William Worrall Mayo who emigrated from Salford, United Kingdom, to the United States in 1846 and became a doctor. William's older son, William James Mayo was born in the home in 1861. William W. Mayo aided pioneers and their families during the Dakota War of 1862 and later moved to Rochester where he became the examining surgeon for the southern Minnesota Civil War draft board.  He and his sons, William and Charles founded the 27-bed Saint Marys Hospital which opened in 1889 following the 1883 Rochester tornado.  They later founded their namesake, the Mayo Clinic.

The next owner of the home was Charlotte Wright Bradley (mother of Elizabeth, who married Carson Nesbit Cosgrove (1853-1936)). Bradley gave the home to the newlyweds in 1874. In 1903 Cosgrove presided at the organizational meeting of the Minnesota Valley Canning Company (later renamed Green Giant), becoming a pioneer of canning in the Minnesota River valley.  Cosgrove's son, Edward, and grandson, Robert, each born in the home, also served as heads of the company over the ensuing decades before the company was swallowed by General Mills.

The Mayo House, also known as the W. W. Mayo House, is a state historic site managed by the Ney Nature Center in partnership with the Minnesota Historical Society. The house has been restored and furnished to appear as in 1860. The Mayoview History Center, located in a separate building, features exhibits about the Mayo family, St. Mary's Hospital and the Mayo Clinic.

See also
Dr. William J. Mayo House, Rochester, Minnesota, also NRHP-listed

References

External links
Minnesota Historical Society: W.W. Mayo House 
W. W. Mayo House, official site

Biographical museums in Minnesota
Historic house museums in Minnesota
Houses completed in 1859
Houses on the National Register of Historic Places in Minnesota
Minnesota Historical Society
Minnesota state historic sites
Museums in Le Sueur County, Minnesota
Houses in Le Sueur County, Minnesota
1859 establishments in Minnesota
National Register of Historic Places in Le Sueur County, Minnesota